The Revolutionary Trade Unions Federation (DEV-İŞ) is a trade union centre in Cyprus. It is affiliated with the World Federation of Trade Unions.  The organization traces its origins to 1975, when workers founded several trade unions that form the basis of the DEV-İŞ confederation.

References

Trade unions established in 1976
Trade unions in Cyprus
World Federation of Trade Unions
1976 establishments in Cyprus
National federations of trade unions